Henry Lee Higginson (November 18, 1834 – November 14, 1919) was an American businessman best known as the founder of the Boston Symphony Orchestra and a patron of Harvard University.

Biography
Higginson was born in New York City on November 18, 1834, the second child of George Higginson and Mary Cabot Lee. He was a brother of James J. Higginson and a distant cousin of Thomas Wentworth Higginson.

When he was four his family moved to Boston. George jointly founded a brokerage as a junior partner, was extremely patriotic, and never owned a house or a horse of his own until within a few years of his death. Henry's mother died of tuberculosis, from which she suffered for some time, when Henry was 15. Henry graduated from Boston Latin School in 1851, only after withdrawing twice due to eye fatigue problems. He began studies at Harvard College, but withdrew after 4 months when he again experienced eye fatigue and he was sent to Europe. Upon returning to Boston in March 1855, Henry's father secured a position for him in the office of Messrs. Samuel and Edward Austin, India merchants, a small shipping counting house on India Wharf where he worked as the sole company clerk and bookkeeper.

Henry Lee Higginson entered the Union Army in May 1861, as second lieutenant of Company D in Colonel George H. Gordon's 2nd Massachusetts Regiment, and fought at the First Battle of Bull Run. He was commissioned major in the 1st Massachusetts Cavalry in March 1862. In the Battle of Aldie (1863) Higginson was knocked from his saddle and received three saber cuts and two pistol wounds. While recovering in Boston he married Ida Olympe Frederika Agassiz (born 9 August 1837 in Carlsruhe, Grand Duchy of Baden), daughter of Harvard professor Louis Agassiz, on 5 December 1863 in Cambridge, Massachusetts. They had two children, Cecile Pauline Higginson (1870–1875) and Alexander Henry Higginson (born 2 April 1876 in Boston).

Though he retired from the military as a colonel, he was commonly addressed as "Major" for the rest of his life to avoid confusion with his older cousin Thomas Wentworth Higginson, who was called Colonel Higginson.

Career
After the war, he worked as an agent for the Buckeye Oil Company in Ohio from January to July 1865, purchasing equipment and contracting laborers to work in the oil fields. In October 1865, he and friends paid $30,000 for five thousand acres (20 km²) of cotton-farming land in Georgia. This failed adventure left him more than $10,000 in debt. Reluctantly at first, out of desperation, he started on January 1, 1868, as a clerk and later became a junior partner in his father’s business, Lee, Higginson & Co., which at the time was a modest brokerage. His father had been a junior partner until 1858 and worked until his death in 1889 at age 85. This brokerage and banking company eventually became very profitable. Henry Lee Higginson was eventually a senior partner.

In 1913, he offered this assessment of changes in business over the course of his career: "There has been a steady improvement in the management of the Stock Exchange since I came down to the financial district. The methods in use to-day are very much better than they were many years ago. Men dealing with the Exchange are better protected." He allowed that there were still "rascals" and "a good many men who still need watching," but "not so many as there have been in years past."

Boston Symphony Orchestra

Higginson described his plans for a symphony orchestra two years after he launched the Boston Symphony Orchestra in 1881:

On March 30, 1881, Higginson published in Boston newspapers his plan for a "Boston Symphony Orchestra" that would perform as a "full and permanent orchestra, offering the best music at low prices, such as may be found in all the large European cities." He advised his first music director, George Henschel, to hire only local musicians for the first year so as to avoid creating bad blood in local musical circles. For the first season's series of 20 concerts, prices were set at $10 or $5 for the whole series. Single ticket prices were set at 75 and 25 cents. For the weekly afternoon public rehearsal, seats were unreserved and all priced at 25 cents. The concert venue was the Boston Music Hall, and the orchestra would travel locally, offering concerts in such cities as Providence, Portland, and Worcester, as well as several in Cambridge at Harvard University's Sanders Theater. Soon, to address concerns about the availability of tickets, 505 tickets for the afternoon rehearsal concerts were sold for 25 cents to those who joined the queue outside the hall in advance of the performance. Tours to more distant cities followed, starting with Philadelphia and then New York. Casual summer concerts began in 1885.

For many years, the organization accepted support from no one other than Higginson, who made up the annual deficit himself (in one year as much as $52,000). From the very beginning through at least the first 30 years of the BSO, through Julius Epstein, a Jewish friend in Vienna, Higginson had access to a continuous stream of the best conductors in the world, all European and German-speaking. In 1906, he sent instructions to those hiring on his behalf that the person they choose should understand that Higginson cared neither for modern music nor "the extreme modern style of conducting." He elaborated his tastes in another letter:

As sole administrator of the BSO during its early years, Higginson ensured the success of his new organization by tightly controlling the professional musicians. In 1882, he forged a new contract requiring his musicians to make themselves available from Wednesday to Saturday during the season and on those days to "neither play in any other orchestra nor under any other conductor...except if wanted in your leisure hours by the Handel and Haydn Society," a collegial gesture to a much older organization. After the fourth season, he authorized the BSO's conductor Wilhelm Gericke to recruit twenty musicians while summering in Europe to replace some who were "old and overworked."

For example, Higginson aggregated control by "threatening to break any strike with the importation of European players." Furthermore, over time he dropped musicians with ties to Boston and imported men from Europe of "high technical accomplishment, upon whose loyalty he could count."

During World War I, Higginson and the BSO's music director Karl Muck were the focus of public controversy when the orchestra failed to add the Star-Spangled Banner to its concerts as other orchestras did. Muck's ties to the German Kaiser made for exaggerated press coverage, but Higginson was the particular focus of criticism. The New York Times called him "obstinate" for his refusal to allow public sentiment to affect programming. The orchestra's publicity agent, writing years later, blamed  Muck's eventual internment as an enemy alien on the "short-sighted stubbornness" of Higginson and the orchestra's manager Charles A. Ellis on the anthem issue.

In February 1918, with his finances so depleted by the war that he could no longer finance the orchestra's deficits alone, and anticipating the departure of Dr. Muck, which came with his arrest in March, Higginson determined to hand the management of the orchestra over to a new institutional structure. The announcement of a board of trustees to manage an incorporated Boston Symphony Orchestra came on April 27, 1918.

Other activities
In 1882, he was awarded an honorary Master of Arts degree from Harvard University and served as the first president of the new Harvard Club of Boston during a period when he helped raise a lot of money to send needy students to Harvard. He was awarded an honorary LL.D. from Yale University in 1901. He served as president of the Boston Music Hall and as a trustee of the New England Conservatory of Music from 1892-1919. He was also the president of the Tavern Club from more than 20 years, a "literary social club."

This land later became Harvard's baseball field, where it still plays today. On June 10 of that year, at the dedication of Soldiers Field, he said:

 
His devotion to education was both enthusiastic and patrician. Once, when advising a cousin to make a large contribution to Harvard he wrote:

Sometime before 1913, he lent his name as an officer to the efforts of the Immigration Restriction League, which campaigned on behalf of literacy tests to limit immigration. Their avoidance of more straightforward racial categories and quotas only masked their fundamental bias against immigrants from Southern and Eastern Europe.

Other gifts to Harvard included $150,000 contributed in 1899 for the construction of the Harvard Union, a "house of fellowship" for all students of Harvard, where they could dine, study, meet, and listen to lectures. A few years later, he raised $10,000 to defray the costs of tuition and living expenses for students from China, a program somewhat at odds with America's exclusion of Chinese immigrants at the time.

Higginson was very active in promoting quality education to citizens from all walks of life. In 1891, Higginson established the Morristown School for young men, now the Morristown-Beard School, declining to be named the school's founder. He was a member of the Board of Trustees of Middlesex School, and the school's Higginson House dormitory is named for him.

He was generally impatient with politicians. He objected to Theodore Roosevelt's attacks on big business. He wrote him: "Cease all harsh words about corporations and capitalists." He did not hesitate to provide President Wilson with unsolicited advice on his conduct of World War I.

Higginson in 1903 became an early advocate for the motor vehicle license plate. Annoyed by drivers speeding by his summer home in Ipswich, Massachusetts with anonymous impunity, Higginson drafted a petition to the state legislature. The petition cited the need for a law whose provisions would expand upon those of a 1901 New York motor vehicle registration law by calling for state-issued license plates to be prominently displayed on all motor vehicles.

On January 25, 1915, Higginson was a participant in the first transcontinental telephone call along with Thomas Watson, Alexander Graham Bell, Theodore Vail and Woodrow Wilson. The telephone Higginson used is now located at the Spark Museum of Electrical Invention.

In 1916, he accepted election to honorary membership in Phi Mu Alpha Sinfonia music fraternity.

He died on November 14, 1919 and was buried in Mount Auburn Cemetery in Cambridge, Massachusetts following funeral services that were later described as "gala obsequies." One cousin's tribute described him: "He always seemed to me like the old knight of the castle–a part he played in some theatricals–giving sympathetic, spirited advice and inspiration of high example to the apprentice squires."

See also

Karl Muck, conductor, Boston Symphony Orchestra
Boston Symphony Orchestra

Notes and citations

References
Cleveland Amory, The Proper Bosonians (NY: E.P. Dutton, 1947)
Paul DiMaggio, "Cultural Entrepreneurship in Nineteenth-Century Boston: The Creation of an Organizational Base for High Culture in America" in Media, Culture and Society, 1982
Henry Lee Higginson, Four Addresses: The Soldiers' Field, the Harvard Union I, the Harvard Union II, Robert Gould Shaw (Boston: D.B. Updike, 1902)
Steven Ledbetter, "Higginson and Chadwick: Non-Brahmins in Boston" by Steven Ledbetter" in American Music Vol. 19, No. 1 (Spring, 2001), 51-63
M.A. De Wolfe Howe, A Great Private Citizen: Henry Lee Higginson (Boston: Atlantic Monthly Press, 1920)
M.A. De Wolfe Howe, The Boston Symphony Orchestra, 1881-1931 (Boston, 1931; NY, 1978)
Bliss Perry, ed., Life and Letters of Henry Lee Higginson (Boston: Atlantic Monthly Press, 1921) 
Richard Poate Stebbins, The Making of Symphony Hall Boston: A History with Documents Including Correspondence of Henry Lee Higginson... (Boston: Boston Symphony Orchestra, 2000)
Oswald Garrison Villard, Prophets True and False (New York: Knopf, 1928)

External links

Harvard University: Papers relating to the gift of Soldiers Field

Union Army officers
Harvard College alumni
People of Massachusetts in the American Civil War
Businesspeople from Boston
1834 births
1919 deaths
Boston Latin School alumni
19th-century American businesspeople
19th-century American philanthropists